Helen Nichol (born 18 February 1981 in Burlington, Ontario) is a female badminton player from Canada, who won the gold medal in the women's doubles competition at the 2003 Pan American Games, partnering Charmaine Reid.

Nichol competed in badminton at the 2004 Summer Olympics in women's doubles with partner Charmaine Reid.  They were defeated by Cheng Wen-Hsing and Chien Yu Chin of Taiwan in the round of 32.

References
 
 tournamentsoftware.com

External links
 

1981 births
Living people
Badminton players at the 2003 Pan American Games
Badminton players at the 2004 Summer Olympics
Badminton players at the 2006 Commonwealth Games
Canadian female badminton players
Olympic badminton players of Canada
Pan American Games gold medalists for Canada
Pan American Games medalists in badminton
Sportspeople from Burlington, Ontario
Medalists at the 2003 Pan American Games
Commonwealth Games competitors for Canada
20th-century Canadian women
21st-century Canadian women